Channel 62 in North America's former analogue NTSC-M system (UHF frequencies 759.25-763.75 MHz) is no longer in television use.

 A fictional analogue "U-62" appears in "UHF" ("Weird Al" Yankovic, 1989) as a struggling independent station.

Canada
The following television stations operate on virtual channel 62 in Canada:
 CJNT-DT in Montreal, Quebec

See also
 Channel 62 virtual TV stations in the United States

62